Jefferson State  may refer to:

 Jefferson Territory (historical Mountain territory), 1859 unrecognized U.S. territory
 Jefferson (proposed Southern state), 1915 proposed U.S. state
 Jefferson (proposed Pacific state), 1941 proposed U.S. state
 Jefferson State Community College, in Alabama

See also

 Jefferson (disambiguation)

State name disambiguation pages